Pitt Street or Jalan Masjid Kapitan Keling in Malay is a major thoroughfare in the city of George Town in Penang, Malaysia. One of the oldest roads in the city centre, it was named after William Pitt the Younger, the Prime Minister of Great Britain in 1786. 

Four places of worship, each of a different religion - Islam, Taoism, Hinduism and Christianity - are located within metres of one another along this street, earning it its nickname, the Street of Harmony. Located within the city's UNESCO World Heritage Site, the street's nickname also reflects the harmonious coexistence of various religions and cultures that have lived here for centuries.

Etymology 
Pitt Street was named after William Pitt the Younger, who was the Prime Minister of Great Britain between 1783 and 1801. 

When Captain Francis Light founded Penang Island in 1786, he renamed the island the Prince of Wales Island in honour of the Prince of Wales, the new settlement of George Town after King George III and the first street within the settlement after himself. Worried that Prime Minister William Pitt may have felt offended as nothing was named after him, Light felt compelled to name Pitt Street after him.

History 
Pitt Street, created soon after the founding of George Town in 1786, is one of the oldest streets in the city. It marked the original western boundary of the settlement of George Town and appeared in the earliest maps of the settlement.

While British administrators and Europeans resided at the northern end of Pitt Street, and built the St. George's Church in 1816, the Indian Muslim community moved into the southern part of Pitt Street.  The Indian Muslim presence can still be seen to this day, particularly by the Kapitan Keling Mosque which was built in 1801.

Meanwhile, the Chinese built the Kong Hock Keong Temple, also known as the Goddess of Mercy Temple, in the early 18th century. The Hindus also constructed the Sri Mahamariamman Temple in 1833; the temple has since become a focal point of George Town's Little India.

The harmonious coexistence of the various religions and cultures along Pitt Street has earned the street its nickname, the Street of Harmony.

Even though the street has been officially renamed as Jalan Masjid Kapitan Keling since the 1990s, local Penangites continue to use the street's old colonial name, Pitt Street. This is partly because the new name sounds unwieldy, but also reflects a strong conservatism in the local population, who see Penang's colonial history as part of their local identity.

Landmarks 
 Kapitan Keling Mosque
 St. George's Church
 Goddess of Mercy Temple
 Penang Chinese Town Hall
 Sri Mahamariamman Temple

See also 
 List of roads in George Town
 Architecture of Penang

References 

Roads in Penang
George Town, Penang